Allodiopsis is a genus of fungus gnats belonging to the family Mycetophilidae.

The genus was described in 1966 by Risto Kalevi Tuomikoski.

The species of this genus are found in Eurasia and Northern America.

Species
Allodiopsis adumbrata Zaitzev, 1982
Allodiopsis bayardi Matile, 1971
Allodiopsis cinerea Freeman, 1951
Allodiopsis composita Ostroverkhova, 1979
Allodiopsis gracai Ševcik & Papp, 2003
Allodiopsis korolevi Zaitzev, 1982
Allodiopsis orientalis Zaitzev, 1993
Allodiopsis pseudodmestica (Lackschewitz, 1937)
Rhymosia rustica Edwards, 1941

References

Mycetophilidae